Ponting: At the Close of Play is the autobiography of the former Australian 
cricketer Ricky Ponting. It was published on 21 October 2013 by HarperSport.

References

2013 non-fiction books
Australian autobiographies
Sports autobiographies
Cricket books
HarperCollins books